Judson may refer to:

Places

Canada
Judson, Alberta
Mount Judson, Vancouver Island, British Columbia

United States
Judson, Indiana, Howard County
Judson, Parke County, Indiana
North Judson, Indiana, Starke County
Judson, Minnesota, an unincorporated community
Judson Township, Blue Earth County, Minnesota
Judson, North Carolina (disambiguation), multiple locations
Judson, South Carolina, Greenville County
Judson, Texas, Gregg County
Judson, West Virginia, Summers County

People
Judson (name)
Judson (footballer, born 1992) (born 1992), Brazilian-Equatoguinean footballer
Judson (footballer, born 1993) (born 1993), Brazilian footballer

Education
Burton–Judson Courts, dormitory at University of Chicago
Judson College (disambiguation), multiple schools
Judson High School, a public secondary school in Converse, Texas
Judson Independent School District, San Antonio, Texas
Judson School, former boarding school in Paradise Valley, Arizona
Judson University, Christian college in Elgin, Illinois; named after Adoniram Judson

Institutions
Judson Dance Theater, a group of postmodern dancers who performed at the church in New York City
Judson Health Center, New York City
Judson Memorial Church, New York City
Judson Studios, Los Angeles
Judson Technologies, a company manufacturing infrared detectors

Science
17844 Judson, 1998 named asteroid

See also
Hudson (disambiguation)